Keeler is a play written by Gill Adams, based on Christine Keeler's 2001 autobiography The Truth At Last: My Story, and is described as being produced with her 'sanction and involvement'.

Productions

The play was produced at the Richmond Theatre in 2011 and at the Charing Cross Theatre, London, in late 2013.  The Charing Cross production ran until 14 December.

Cast

2013 Crew

Critical reception

The play has received mixed reviews.  One, described the play as a 'dud', but another  while pointing out that the factual accuracy of the play is uncertain (because 'We can't be sure what really happened'), said that if 'judged purely as drama...it works admirably.'

References

2011 plays
British plays